James Mcclure Glasgow (1850 – 12 August 1934) was a New Zealand cricketer. He played three first-class matches for Otago between 1866 and 1869.

Glasgow was born in British India in 1850. He was educated at Otago Boys' High School in Dunedin and later worked as a civil servant and as an accountant.

References

External links
 

1850 births
1934 deaths
New Zealand cricketers
Otago cricketers